After the Rain is a Japanese male musical duo group under music label NBCUniversal Entertainment Japan. The group abbreviation is mainly AtR. The group consists of two members: Soraru and Mafumafu.

History 
The group is active on Niconico. The official name of the group was formed by Mafumafu and Soraru. Previously, their group was active as Soraru X Mafumafu (Also known as: Sorairo Muffler (そらいろまふらー)). They made collaboration videos and radio Hikikomoranai Radio. They released albums After Rain Quest and Prerhythm Arch. In music making, Soraru is vocal & mixing mastering and Mafumafu is in charge of vocal, songwriting and arrangement. In this way, they maintain the stance of sharing all the work and completing it with two people. In addition, they work on live performances and goods.

The origin of the name was revealed in an interview. They said "We were often sad and pained, but from now on, we want to walk in the world after such rain".

In the winter of 2015, before the unit group name was officially announced, the Live tour After the Rain WINTER TOUR 2015 was held in Nagoya, Osaka, Fukuoka and Tokyo. Additionally, a one-man live, After the Rain (Mafumafu X Soraru) Ryogoku Kokugikan 2016 Morning Glow After Glow, was held at Ryogoku Kokugikan for two days on July 16 and 17, and mobilized 12,000 people.

In April 2016, After the Rain Official homepage there was a farce that it would be as Mahō shōjo After the rain  (魔法少女あふた〜ざ☆れいん), a unit by Soraruko-chan (Soraru) and Mafuyuchan (Mafumafu). It's called a big response so that access was concentrated all day long, Mahō shōjo After the rain Miracle box  (魔法少女あふた〜ざ☆れいん ミラクルBOX)  will be released. And it was sold at the live venue of After the rain Ryogoku Kokugikan 2016 and sold out. Kurocrest Story released on April 13, 2016 made it into the top 100 ranking as the 1st album.

In 2015, the Live tour After the Rain TOUR 2016 WINTER GARDEN was held in Sapporo, Osaka, Nagoya, and Tokyo in winter 2016. Also, because Soraru was ill, the Tokyo performance was postponed and a transfer performance was held on February 23.

On April 12, 2017, their single debut in the form of simultaneous release of two singles Kaidoku funō, Anti-clockwise which are the opening and ending songs of the anime Atom: The Beginning and Clockwork Planet respectively. Oricon Single Weekly Ranking on April 24 in Anti-clockwise in 3rd place and Kaidoku funō was in 4th place.

On August 9–10, 2017, the Live After the Rain Nippon Budokan 2017 -Clockwise / Anti-Clockwise - was held at Nippon Budokan and mobilized 26,000 fans.

Continuing from 2016, 2017 and 2018 in April Fool's Day a new song was announced by the two who became girls with Mahō shōjo After the rain specifications.

The live After the Rain Saitama Super Arena 2018 Rain-making feast／Feast of begging was held on August 7 and 8, 2018. It mobilized 36,000 people in total for two days.

On September 5 of the same year, the 2nd album Izanaware Traveler was released for the first time in about 2 years and 5 months. On the Oricon album weekly chart dated September 17, 2018, the initial sales were 82,280, which greatly exceeded the previous work's 36,000, Recorded 2nd place for the first appearance. The album was certified as a gold disc on October 10, 2018.

As the theme song of Pokémon to be broadcast from November 2019, Mafumafu became the first singing artist of 1 ・ 2 ・ 3.

Member

Discography

Single

Limited Single

Album

Doujin Album

Filmography

TV Shows

References

External links 

 

Musical groups established in 2016
Japanese musical duos
Utaite
Anime singers
Male musical duos
2016 establishments in Japan